Girlfight is a 2000 American film by Karyn Kusama, starring Michelle Rodriguez.

Girlfight or Girl Fight may also refer to:
Girl Fight (film), a 2011 television film
Girl Fight (video game), a 2013 fighting game
Girlfight (song), a single by Brooke Valentine

See also
Catfight (disambiguation)
Fight Girls
Fighting Girl
Fight Like a Girl (disambiguation)